Jude Anthony Angelini (born 1977), also known as Rude Jude, is an American radio and television personality and author. He is best known for his radio show The All Out Show that has broadcast on SiriusXM satellite radio's Shade 45 since 2005.

Career

Jenny Jones
Jude appeared often as a guest on The Jenny Jones Show, where he first received the nickname "Rude Jude" as he insulted other participants in the show.  Jones describes Jude as "the studio audience’s favorite guest."

Eminem
Based on Jude's appearances on The Jenny Jones Show, a promoter met Jude and had him introduce Eminem at a concert performance.  Later, Jude was directly referenced in Eminem's song, "Drug Ballad," with the lyrics "17 years later I'm as rude as Jude."

Foreally show
From 2013 to 2015 he also hosted a weekly podcast "Foreallyshow" with childhood friend, rapper Senim Silla of Binary Star.

The All Out Show
On SiriusXM satellite radio's Shade 45, Eminem's Hip-Hop Channel, The All Out Show with Rude Jude  has been broadcast every weekday between 4:00pm and 7:00pm Eastern time since May 2016.

Penthouse Magazine 
Angelini was profiled as Man of the Moment in Penthouse magazine May/June 2019 issue.

Proposed TV Series
The producers of Entourage announced plans in 2015 to create a comedy series based on Jude's book, "Hyena" but Angelini updated his listeners on the radio that Hyena show plans have been put on indefinite hold.

Filmography

Television

Bibliography

Fin - 2022 - ISBN 979-8412375892

References

External links
 

1977 births
Living people
American radio personalities
Place of birth missing (living people)
American television personalities
People from Pontiac, Michigan